Osvald Adolfovich Reshke (born 27 September 1883, date of death unknown) was a Russian Empire sports shooter. He competed in three events at the 1912 Summer Olympics.

References

External links
 

1883 births
Year of death missing
Male sport shooters from the Russian Empire
Olympic competitors for the Russian Empire
Shooters at the 1912 Summer Olympics
Sportspeople from Kyiv